The San Pietro di Positano is a 5-star luxury hotel located near the town of Positano on the Amalfi Coast of Italy.

History

The San Pietro di Positano hotel was designed and built by Carlo "Carlino" Cinque (1911–1984). Before purchasing the land upon which the hotel now sits, Cinque purchased a house in the city with hopes of turning it into a hotel, he called it The Miramare.    

The Miramare gradually became more established and ultimately one of the more popular hotels on the Amalfi Coast. Cinque took to rowing his small fishing boat in the late afternoon to a headland two km south of Positano in the Laurito district that everybody knew as La Punta (The Point), where he dropped his lobster pots. It had a small beach, lush vegetation, and most notably was characterized by a tall cliff that abruptly met the sea. At the top was a small, white-walled fisherman's chapel called San Pietro. Cinque fell in love with it and resolved to buy the land from his brother-in-law, which he accomplished in 1962. In 1962 when Cinque purchased the land it was described as "the promontory between Positano and Praiano, that is just a rock with a small 17th century chapel of San Pietro." Positano, at the time, was a small fishing village, but it was gradually starting to attract the attention of tourists. Following this purchase, Cinque undertook a gradual expansion of the chapel into an apartment with a garden and terraces, doing his best to avoid disturbing the natural character of the land. His idea was to build a hotel that would blend in with the surrounding landscape.  

Cinque undertook the roles of architect, construction engineer, site supervisor, and interior designer. The only advice he took was from an electrical engineer. The most difficult aspect was the blasting that took place in the cliff to install an elevator from the main lobby 88 meters (288 ft) down to connects to a 22 m (75 ft) long horizontal tunnel, which led out to a seaside sunbathing platform and bar. Eight years were spent dynamiting and cutting through the cliff. Another three were spent constructing the buildings that would make the hotel. The hotel opened to the public on 29 June 1970 with 33 rooms.  

As Cinque wanted the interior to have minimal separation from the outside landscape, including its plants and flowers, he drilled through walls, ceilings and floors and threaded vines and creepers through the openings, training them to grow from the outside in.

As time went on, he added more rooms and more gardens to the hotel on nearly a dozen levels. Some face the sea, while others provide views of Positano and the little village of Praiano several kilometers to the south.

Carlino Cinque died in 1984, with 2,000 people attending his funeral. His niece Virginia Attanasio (1935 - ) and her brother Salvatore, took over ownership and management of the hotel. Since the death of Salvatore in 1996, the hotel has been owned and managed by Virginia Attanasio and her two sons, Vito Cinque and Carlo Cinque.

In 1989, the hotel joined the Relais et Chateaux hotel group.

In 2002, the Zass restaurant (which was previously just called the "Restaurant at Il San Pietro") received a Michelin star.  In the same year, the Spa, located in a former farm building, opened its doors.
In 2008, the Carlino restaurant (which is located at sea level and is open only to guests) was opened.
In 2016, the hotel completed a nine month long, a €3 million
construction of a new kitchen which required the extraction of 1,000 cubic meters of rock, under the supervision of kitchen designer Andrea Viacava and architect Fausta Gaetani. The kitchen, which is spread over two levels, covers 400 square meters and can produce up to 400 meals a day. It is equipped with an ozone treatment system, which every day at 2am, hermetically seals the kitchen and fills it with ozone, which sanitizes the kitchen.  At the time of its installation, only two other restaurants in the world had a similar system.

Hotel guests have included Giovanni Agnelli, Richard Burton, Claudette Colbert, Dustin Hoffman, Rudolf Nureyev, Gregory Peck, Liza Minnelli, Laurence Olivier, Anthony Quinn, who brought his family for an entire month, Tina Turner, Brooke Shields, Barbra Streisand, Misa, Zuko, Julia Roberts, François Mitterrand and the King of Jordan. Peter O'Toole spent a month at the hotel in 1975 with his then wife Sian Phillips recovering from surgery for  pancreatitis, which removed his pancreas and a large portion of his stomach.

The hotel was voted the 8th best hotel in Italy in the Readers' Choice Awards 2016.

Notes

References

Further reading

External links

Official Website

Hotels in Italy